"Time to Love" is a 2013 pop and dance song by the Greek-Cypriot singer Ivi Adamou with the Spanish DJ Marsal Ventura. It was announced that the song would be released in February 2013. In mid-February Ivi announced through her Facebook page that the song would be released on 27 February 2013 at Flaix FM and will be on sale on 5 March. A teaser of the song was released on 21 February.

Background and release
The song was released on 27 February 2013 through the Spanish radio Flaix FM. The song is available for download on 5 March 2013. Few minutes after the songs was played in the radio a lyric video was uploaded in Marsal's official channel.

The single was released in Spain, Greece and Cyprus on 5 March. Later, on 19 April, it was released in Russia, Sweden, Norway and the United Kingdom.

Track listing
CD Single
"Time to Love" (Radio Edit) - 3:36
"Time to Love" (Extended) - 4:21
Digital download
"Time to Love" (Radio Edit) - 3:36

Credits and personnel
 Lead vocals – Ivi Adamou
 Producers – Marsal Ventura
 Lyrics – Marsal Ventura
 Label: Sony Music Greece, Sony Music Spain & LaDans

Release history

References

Ivi Adamou songs
2013 singles
English-language Cypriot songs
2012 songs